The Tampa Bay Rowdies were an American professional soccer team based in Tampa, Florida, that competed in the original North American Soccer League (NASL) from 1975 to 1984. They enjoyed broad popular support in the Tampa Bay area until the NASL folded in 1984, after which the team played in various minor indoor and outdoor leagues before finally folding on January 31, 1994. The Rowdies played nearly all of their outdoor home games at Tampa Stadium and nearly all of their indoor games at the Bayfront Center Arena in nearby St. Petersburg, Florida. Although San Diego played indoors until 1996, the Rowdies were the last surviving NASL franchise that played outdoor soccer on a regular basis.

NASL: 1975–1984
On June 19, 1974 George Strawbridge and Beau Rogers, IV purchased an expansion franchise in North American Soccer League for the sum of $25,000 and by July 24 they named Eddie Firmani their coach. In October 1974, Alex Pringle becomes the first player to sign with the team. On November 21, 1974, the Tampa Bay Professional Soccer Club announced that they would henceforth be known as the Tampa Bay Rowdies. The Rowdies played ten seasons at Tampa Stadium and won their only Soccer Bowl championship in their 1975 inaugural season, defeating the Portland Timbers 2–0 on August 24. The Rowdies also finished as runners-up in 1978 and 1979. The team showcased international stars such as midfielder, and team captain Rodney Marsh (England), 1979 league scoring leader Óscar Fabbiani (Chile), swift and forward Steve Wegerle (South Africa), rock-solid defenseman Arsene Auguste (Haiti), 1976 NASL goal scoring champion Derek Smethurst (South Africa), who was also the franchise's all-time leading goal scorer with 57 tallies in 65 games, as well as forward Clyde Best (Bermuda). Coached along the way by Firmani, John Boyle, Gordon Jago, Al Miller, and Marsh after his retirement, their catch phrase and marketing slogan was "The Rowdies arrrre...a kick in the grass!"

While no NASL team ever captured a treble, in 1975–76 Tampa Bay came the closest by winning the three different NASL titles available at the time (Soccer Bowl '75, 1976 Indoor Title, 1976 Regular Season title) in succession within twelve months. On and off the pitch, the Rowdies would prove to be one of the league's most recognizable brands. At one three-year point in their history, the team regularly drew crowds of well over 25,000 a night. In 1979 three different matches were attended by over 40,000 people, and the following year two more surpassed the 50,000 mark. The Rowdies had long-standing rivalries with both the Ft. Lauderdale Strikers and the New York Cosmos.

Following the 1981 season the Dallas Tornado merged with Tampa Bay. At the time, Dallas principals Lamar Hunt and Bill McNutt retained a minority stake in the Rowdies. Two years later after the 1983 season, Strawbidge, Hunt and McNutt sold the team outright to local investors Stella Thayer, Bob Blanchard and Dick Corbett.

Year-by-year

Home attendance records
*playoff game

NASL Indoor Soccer
In the winter of 1975, the NASL ran a two-tiered, 16 team indoor tournament with four regional winners meeting in a "final-four" style championship.  The Rowdies defeated the New York Cosmos 13–5 in the semi-final, before losing 8–5 to the host San Jose Earthquakes in the finals on March 16 at the Cow Palace.  The Rowdies again reached the final-four in 1976, but that year were the host team. This time Tampa Bay would not be denied, as they followed up a 6–2 semi-final win over Dallas with a 6–4 finals triumph over the Rochester Lancers on March 27 in the Bayfront Center. Over the next few years, the Rowdies (and a handful of other NASL teams) played indoor friendlies and invitationals as preparation for the start of the outdoor season. The NASL did not sanction a full indoor season until 1979–80, when the Rowdies won the championship by defeating the Memphis Rogues 2 games to 1.  The 1980–81 campaign marked the first time Tampa Bay had ever missed the playoffs, indoor or outdoor. In the 1981–82 season they lost the finals to the San Diego Sockers 2 games to 0. Once again the NASL chose not to sanction a full indoor season in 1982–83, but (in addition to a few friendlies) Tampa Bay and three other teams participated in the Grand Prix of Indoor Soccer. The Rowdies finished second in the round-robin stage and subsequently went on to defeat Montreal for the championship in a double overtime thriller at the Montreal Forum; 5–4. The final NASL indoor season took place in 1983–84 and the Rowdies finished last out of the seven teams. Due to scheduling issues that season, the Rowdies played five games at the Bayfront Center, eight at the State Fairgrounds' Expo Hall in Tampa, and three in the Lakeland Civic Center. Tampa Bay regularly drew home crowds of over five thousand "fannies" to the Bayfront Center, despite the arena's limited seating capacity and relatively remote location.

Indoor home attendance records
*playoff game

Players, coaches, and honors – NASL era

Honors

NASL championships (1)
 1975
 runner-up: 1978, 1979

NASL Indoor championships (3)
 1976, 1979–80, 1983 
 runner-up: 1975, 1979, 1981–82

Regular Season Premiership (1)
 1976 (18–6 -154 points)
 runner-up: 1975

Division titles (6)
 1975 Eastern Division
 1976 Eastern Division, Atlantic Conference
 1978 Eastern Division, American Conference
 1979 Eastern Division, American Conference
 1980 Eastern Division, American Conference
 1979–80 Eastern Division Playoffs (indoor)

Conference Titles (3)
 1978 American Conference
 1979 American Conference
 1981–82 Atlantic Conference (indoor)

Regional Titles (2)
 1975 Indoor Region 3
 1976 Indoor East Region

League scoring champion
 1979 Óscar Fabbiani (25 goals, 8 assists, 58 points)

League goal scoring champion
 1976 Derek Smethurst (20 goals)

Indoor Grand Prix Assists Leader
 1983 Wes McLeod (13 assists)

Finals MVP
 1975 Stewart Jump
 1976 Clyde Best (indoor)
 1979–80 ???? (indoor)

Regionals MVP
 1975 Ringo Cantillo (indoor)
 1976 Stewart Scullion (indoor)

Coach of the Year
 1976 Eddie Firmani

Rookie of the Year
 1982 Pedro DeBrito
 1983 Gregg Thompson
 1984 Roy Wegerle

North American Player of the Year
 1976 Arnie Mausser

FIFA World Cup players
  Adrian Alston (1974)
  Carlos Babington (1974)
  Clodoaldo (1970)
  Antônio Lima dos Santos (1966)
  Mirandinha (1974)
  Terry Moore (1986)  did not play
  Eduardo Bonvallet (1982)
  Manny Rojas (1982)
  Arsène Auguste (1974)
  Hugo Pérez (1994)
  Roy Wegerle (1994, 1998)

NASL All-time Leaders
 Consecutive regular season starts: Mike Connell (179)
 Career games by a US-born player: Arnie Mausser (224)

All-Star first team selections
 1975 Farrukh Quraishi
 1976 Rodney Marsh, Arnie Mausser, Tommy Smith
 1977 Derek Smethurst
 1978 Rodney Marsh
 1979 Mike Connell
 1980 Mike Connell
 1981 John Gorman
 1982 Peter Nogly

All-Star second team selections
 1975 John Boyle, Stewart Jump, Stewart Scullion
 1976 Stewart Jump, Stewart Scullion, Derek Smethurst
 1977 Arsène Auguste, Rodney Marsh, Steve Wegerle
 1978 Arsène Auguste, Steve Wegerle
 1979 Óscar Fabbiani, John Gorman
 1980 Steve Wegerle

All-Star honorable mentions
 1975 Clyde Best, John Sissons, Derek Smethurst
 1979 Rodney Marsh, Steve Wegerle
 1980 John Gorman
 1982 Mike Connell
 1983 Gregg Thompson
 1984 Gregg Thompson

Indoor All-Stars
 1975 Doug Wark (All-Tournament Team)
 1976 Clyde Best (All-Tournament Team)
 1976 Derek Smethurst (All-Tournament Team)
 1976 Stewart Scullion (All-Tournament Team)
 1976 Arsène Auguste (All-Eastern Regional Team)
 1976 Rodney Marsh (All-Eastern Regional Team)
 1976 Stewart Scullion (All-Eastern Regional Team)
 1980–81 Steve Wegerle (All-East Team)
 1981–82 Tatu (Atlantic)
 1981–82 Mike Connell (Atlantic)
 1981–82 Jürgen Stars (Atlantic)
 1981–82 John Gorman (2nd team)
 1983–84 Frantz Mathieu (reserve)
 1983–84 Mike Connell (reserve)

U.S. Soccer Hall of Fame members
 1992 Lamar Hunt
 1995 Al Miller
 2003 Arnie Mausser
 2008 Hugo Pérez
 2015 Glenn Myernick

Canadian Soccer Hall of Fame members
 2004 Bob Bolitho
 2005 Wes McLeod
 2005 Terry Moore
 2008 Jack Brand

Indoor Soccer Hall of Fame members
 2012 Tatu
 2013 Gordon Jago

Other National Halls of Fame
 2000 Adrian Alston (Australia)

Head coaches
 *Excludes friendlies. ^Cup includes playoff games and mini-games.

Team captains
*due to Connell injury

Most appearances in club history
*Excludes friendlies and indoor matches. ^Includes playoff games.

Retired numbers

In a ceremony held before the final home game of the 1989 regular season, Steve Wegerle became the first Tampa Bay Rowdies player to have his number retired by the team. That night he assisted on all three Rowdies' goals in a 3–0 victory over arch-rival Fort Lauderdale. He went on to appear in several home matches during the 1990 season as well.

While Mike Connell's and Perry Van der Beck's numbers have since been retired by the current franchise, Wegerle's #7 continues to be reissued each season.

Notes

Club culture
As part of a name-the-team contest, on November 21, 1974, the franchise announced that the name Tampa Bay Rowdies had been selected. Out of nearly 12,500 entries it was Clearwater attorney, Bill Wilhelm's suggestion that won. That suggestion earned Wilhelm a vacation to Acapulco for his efforts, along with a lifetime pass to all home games. The Rowdies' fans were known as "Fannies". Advertisements for the club declared that "Soccer is a kick in the grass" and encouraged their supporters to "Get up, get out, and get Rowdy!" and to "make a fanny of yourself!". The calls were answered by fans who threw confetti, drank beer, chanted during games, and generally "let the guys know we're behind them." One memorable fan named Bob Rogers won a "Rowdiest Fan" contest by donning a giant soccer head and throwing himself into the Tampa Stadium goal. The club gave "Soccer Head" complimentary tickets to future games so that he could continue his antics for the crowd, even bringing him along when the Rowdies played in Soccer Bowl '79.

While anyone who supported the club could call themselves a Fanny, members of the official Rowdies Fan Club particularly claimed the moniker as their own. The fan club held regular meetings and social events and published a newsletter.

The "Wowdies" were the Rowdies' cheerleaders. The team also had a pep band known as the "Loudies" that sat in the south endzone and attended local pep rallies.

Post-NASL: 1985–1993
The NASL folded in 1984, but the Rowdies continued to play for several more years. Tampa Stadium continued to be used as their home ground for outdoor games except during the 1991 and 1992 seasons in the APSL. Those two years were spent at the USF Soccer Stadium, before returning to Tampa Stadium in 1993 for the team's final season in existence.

Independent: 1985–1987
With Rodney Marsh staying on as coach (through 1987), the Rowdies operated as an independent team for two years before joining the American Indoor Soccer Association for one season (1986–87). Cornelia Corbett, Dick Corbett's wife and a businesswoman in her own right, became sole owner of the team in 1986. As a footnote, in 2011 the University of South Florida opened the new Corbett Soccer Stadium for their NCAA Division I men's and women's teams, after the Corbetts had made a $1.5 million donation to the project. The stadium features several display cases that highlight the history of the Tampa Bay Rowdies. Since 2005, the USF Bulls and the crosstown rival University of Tampa Spartans men's squads have competed annually for the preseason Rowdies Cup, which celebrates the city's rich soccer history. To date the NCAA Division II Spartans have only captured the trophy once, back in 2012.

1985 Outdoor
As an independent club, the Rowdies played only one match in 1985. It was against the U.S. Men's team on the Fourth of July in front of 30,038 fans.

1986 Outdoor
In the summer of 1986 the Rowdies staged a four-game series at Tampa Stadium called the Coca-Cola Classic International Soccer Series, which culminated with a Fourth of July match, and also included a post-game fireworks display and laser light show. Since Tampa Bay had only a handful of players under contract at the time, their roster was composed mostly of guest players from Queens Park Rangers F.C. The only NASL-era Rowdies on this roster were Roy Wegerle, Steve Wegerle, Dave Power, and the head coach, Rodney Marsh. Four former Rowdies played in the final game of this series for the opposing NASL All-Stars. These included Mike Connell, Winston DuBose, Wes McLeod and Tatu.

They also played a pair of friendlies against the newly established Orlando Lions on February 22 and July 2 at Lake Brantley High School, using their regular players. Tampa Bay won the matches by scores of 1–0 and 2–1(SO) respectively.

1987 Outdoor
In 1987 Tampa Bay played twice against the Orlando Lions, on May 16 at the Florida Citrus Bowl, and then again on May 23 at Pepin-Rood Stadium. The Rowdies lost the first encounter, 2–0, with the teams tying, 2–2, in the return leg.

1985–87 Outdoor results

AISA: 1986–1987
The Rowdies played one season of indoor soccer in the American Indoor Soccer Association, once again using the Bayfront Center as their home. After a strong start they finished third in their division and eventually lost in the first round of the playoffs. Steve Wegerle was selected as a starter in the AISA All-Star game and scored the game's first goal. Arnie Mausser, Rubén Astigarraga, and Glenn Ervine also made the Southern Division team. Ervine added a goal in the fourth quarter. Tim Walters was a late All-Star addition, because Astigarraga was unable play in the match.

Year-by-year

1986–1987 roster

1 –  Arnie Mausser 35 Apps 0 Goals
2 –  Arsène Auguste
3 –  David Dodge
4 –  Dave Power
5 –  Steve Savage
5 –  Wim Suurbier (player/asst. coach)
6 –  Peter Roe
6 –  Mike Balson
7 –  Steve Wegerle 35 Apps 26 Goals
8 –  Rodney Marsh (player/head coach)
9 –  Jay White
10 –  Rubén Astigarraga
10 –  Derek Sanderson
11 –  Duncan MacEwan

12 –  Tony Frankovich
12 –  Derek Smethurst
13 –  Tim Walters
14 –  Geoff Wegerle
15 –  Mark Lindsay
16 –  Karim Murabet
17 –  Paul Roe
18 –  Nathan Sacks
19 –  Nick Mangione
20 –  Soloman Hilton
21 –  Tim Borer
22 –  Mike Fall
23 –  Glenn Ervine
 Rui Farias

ASL/APSL: 1988–1993
In the summer of 1988, the Rowdies joined the third incarnation of the American Soccer League. They would stay in this league and its successor (the APSL) until the team folded after the 1993 season. During this six year stretch they achieved moderate success, winning one division title and making the playoffs four times. In 1992 they finished as runners-up to Colorado in the regular season, in the Professional Cup final, and in the APSL final as well.

Year-by-year

Players, coaches, and honors – post-NASL era

Honors – post-NASL

Championships
 1992: ASPL (runner-up)
 1992: Professional Cup (runner-up)

Division titles
  1989: ASL Southern Division

Leading Scorer
 1992: Jean Harbor (13 g, 4 a)

Top Goalkeeper
 1988: Winston DuBose (0.75 gaa)

Assists Leader
 1992: Kevin Sloan (6 a)

Coach of the Year
 1992: Ricky Hill
 1993: Ken Fogarty

FIFA World Cup players
  Arsène Auguste (1974)
  Wim Suurbier (1974, 1978)
  Steve Trittschuh (1990)
  Peter Vermes (1990)

First Team All Star
 1988: Winston DuBose, Steve Wegerle
 1989: Winston DuBose, Steve Trittschuh, Steve Wegerle
 1990: David Byrne
 1992: Bill Andracki, Steve Trittschuh, Ricky Hill, Kevin Sloan, Jean Harbor
 1993: Steve Trittschuh
Second Team All Star
 1986–87: Arnie Mausser
 1991: Marcelo Carrera
 1993: Paul Dougherty, Pierre Morice
Honorable Mention
 1986–87: Steve Wegerle

AISA All-Star Game selections
 1986–87: Steve Wegerle (starter)
 1986–87: Arnie Mausser (reserve)
 1986–87: Glenn Ervine (reserve)
 1986–87: Rubén Astigarraga (injured)
 1986–87: Tim Walters (reserve)

U.S. Soccer Hall of Fame members
 2013 Peter Vermes

Other National Halls of Fame
 2016 Mark Lawrenson (England)

Coaches – post-NASL
  Rodney Marsh: 1984–1987
  Wim Suurbier: 1986–87
  Ken Fogarty: 1989–1992
  Steve Wegerle: 1991–1992
  Ricky Hill: 1992
  Ken Fogarty: 1993

Team captains – post-NASL
  Dave Power: 1986–1989
  Derek Backman: 1990
  David Byrne: 1991
  Ricky Hill: 1992
  Terry Rowe: 1993

Legacy

Tampa Bay Mutiny: 1996–2001

Due in large part to the Rowdies' historical success on and off the pitch, in 1994 MLS selected the Tampa Bay Mutiny as one of its original ten teams. The Mutiny won the first ever Supporters' Shield and qualified for the playoffs in four of their six seasons. Several former Rowdies, including Perry Van der Beck, Farrukh Quraishi, Roy Wegerle and Steve Trittschuh among others, were involved with the Mutiny as players, coaches, or front office staff. They also played for three seasons on the Rowdies' home pitch, Tampa Stadium. While the Mutiny have no connection to either Rowdies franchise, the team often paid tribute to the former Rowdies by wearing jerseys of their colors, and even wearing the logo of both the Tampa Bay Mutiny and Rowdies on the same shirt.

MLS initially operated the team with the hope of selling to a private local owner. That became difficult after Malcolm Glazer bought the Tampa Bay Buccaneers of the National Football League in 1995 and demanded that the community build a new stadium. Raymond James Stadium was completed in 1998 and Tampa Stadium was demolished soon thereafter, forcing the Mutiny to move to the new facility.

The Bucs' lease agreement in their new home allowed them to keep most non-ticket revenues from all events at the facility, including Mutiny matches, severely damaging the financial viability of the soccer club. As financial losses mounted (up to $2 million a year), MLS desperately courted Glazer to buy the Mutiny. Glazer declined, so the league opted to fold the Mutiny, along with other Florida-based MLS team of that era, the Miami Fusion, in early 2002.

New Rowdies: 2010–present

In 2008, it was announced that a new incarnation of the Tampa Bay Rowdies would play in a new second division NASL.  They wore striped green and gold kits similar to the old Rowdies, and a star reflecting the 1975 championship. After several changes to the league,  Tampa Bay finally kicked off in the summer of 2010, but they took the pitch as "FC Tampa Bay" due to a licensing dispute over the Rowdies name and trademarks. Beginning in 2012, the team reached an agreement to officially use the Rowdies name along with logos and other intellectual property of the original team, and won Soccer Bowl 2012.

To date, the new Rowdies have honored both Mike Connell's and Perry Van der Beck's significant contribution to soccer, both on and off the field in the community at large, by retiring their jerseys. The Rowdies won the 2012 NASL Championship. As of 2017 they are currently members of the second division, United Soccer League, and have announced their intention to gain entry into MLS's next wave of expansion.

Rowdies Cup

The South Florida Bulls annually face their crosstown rivals, the Tampa Spartans, in an NCAA men's preseason soccer match which celebrates the Tampa Bay Area's rich soccer history. In addition to holding the Rowdies Cup trophy for the next 12 months, the winning side also get to hoist the actual Soccer Bowl trophy that was won originally by the Rowdies in 1975. The trophy is currently housed at Corbett Soccer Stadium on the USF campus. Formerly called the Mayor's Cup from 1979 until 2005, as of the 2019 edition, USF holds a 24–10–3 edge in the all-time series, which dates back to 1972.

Tampa Bay Terror & Florida Tropics SC
Indoor soccer by the Rowdies had officially ended when the team played in the American Indoor Soccer Association for one season (1986–87). For two seasons, another Tampa Bay area team played in the same league, from 1995-1997, called the Tampa Bay Terror; however, the team did not last more than two seasons, despite having some members of the Rowdies on the roster. It was not until 2016 that a stable indoor soccer team played in the region. Another unrelated indoor soccer team called the Florida Tropics SC have played in the Major Arena Soccer League since 2016. The team eventually began outdoor competition, also competing in the developmental United Premier Soccer League. Despite being unrelated to the Rowdies, these two teams succeed the Tampa Bay region in indoor soccer since the original Rowdies had folded.

References

External links
 "official" Tampa Bay Rowdies site
 Rowdies history
 "superfan" Ian Morris' site

 
Defunct indoor soccer clubs in the United States
Soccer clubs in Tampa, Florida
Soccer clubs in Florida
Defunct soccer clubs in Florida
Association football clubs established in 1974
Association football clubs disestablished in 1993
American Soccer League (1988–89) teams
American Indoor Soccer Association teams
North American Soccer League (1968–1984) teams
American Professional Soccer League teams
Sports in St. Petersburg, Florida
1974 establishments in Florida
1993 disestablishments in Florida